Rated Love is the fourth studio album by American R&B recording artist Keke Wyatt. It was released on April 22, 2016, by Aratek Entertainment and INgrooves via Universal Music Group.The album was preceded by the release of three singles: "Sexy Song", "Love Me" and "Jodeci".

Background, release and promotion 
In 2015, after the release of her previous album Ke'Ke' (2014), Keke Wyatt started recording her upcoming fourth album, titled Rated Love. Wyatt posted a video on her personal YouTube account, previewing a snippet of her lead single "Sexy Song" for her fourth album Rated Love on November 7, 2015. On February 19, 2016, Wyatt announced on her Twitter, that the album would be available for pre-order on digital music stores, while also revealing the album cover. On March 18, 2016, Wyatt announced on social media such as Instagram, Twitter and Facebook, with a release of her second single from Rated Love would be called "Love Me". On October 13, 2016, Wyatt revealed a new single, called "Jodeci" on her Instagram account, stating "I think we got a new one with my new single Jodeci!!! I wanna know what ya'll think" revealing it would be released with a deluxe version of her album Rated Love on October 21, 2016.

Critical response 

Soulinstereo gave the album a 3.5 rating, stating that "If the album’s title wasn’t enough to clue you in on this album’s themes, the tracks themselves tell the story: “Love Me,” “Dumb Love,” Still Have Love,” “Love Reigns” — KeKe’s fourth album is an audio love letter, with the mistress of ceremonies simply narrating life’s emotional rollercoasters.

Centric gave a review of the album stating "Her single "Love Me," perfectly captures the ups and downs of marriage and relationships, particularly when you're faced with conflict but yet can't help but be with the one you love. Another standout record on the album, "If It Ain't You"—among many others—is a beautiful ballad that showcases Keke's natural ability to breathe life into a love song like no other."

Singles 
"Sexy Song" was released as the album's lead single on November 20, 2015. The single featured on the U.S. Adult R&B Songs chart peaking at number 26. The music video for "Sexy Song" was released on Wyatt's YouTube channel on February 18, 2016, directed by Steven C. Pitts and filmed by Rite Media Group.

"Love Me" was released as the album's second single on March 18, 2016.

"Jodeci" was released as the album's third single. The music video was released to Wyatt's YouTube channel on October 17, 2016.Keke also sings a bit of Jodeci's "I'm Still Waiting", which was released in 1992, at the end of the track.

Live performances 
Wyatt performed an impromptu version of the lead single "Sexy Song" at SOB's in New York City. Wyatt also performed "Sexy Song" at the Capitale night club in Washington, DC on December 12, 2015, and on Essence Live on February 12, 2016.

Commercial performance 
The album debuted at number 11 on the US Billboard Top R&B Albums, number 16 on the Billboard Top Independent Album, and number 19 on the Billboard Top R&B/Hip-Hop Albums charts on May 14, 2016. The album also charted at number eighty on the Billboard Top Current Albums chart.

Track listing 
Album credits taken from Discogs.

Credits and personnel 
Album credits taken from AllMusic.

 Performers and musicians

Keke Wyatt – vocals, background vocals, composition

 Technical personnel

Aaron Scott – production
Alex D. Rogers – photography
Brandon Hesson – composition
Carmael Frith – composition
Diego Morales – production
Dominic Gordon – composition, engineering, mixing, production
Eero Turunen – production
Jenny Karr – composition
Jevon Hill – production
Johnnie Miller – production
Kevin "KP" Pridgen, Jr. – engineering, mixing, production
Kyle Christopher – composition
Michael Ford – executive production
Peter Penn – composition
Profango Amore – graphic design
Robert Erness – composition, production
Shantee Tyler – composition
Steve Morales – engineer, mixing
Terrell "Hendrix" Green – production
Theodore Thomas – production
Wayne Wilson – composition

Charts

Release history

References 

2016 albums
Keke Wyatt albums